Tyrus Wayne Thomas (born August 17, 1986) is an American former professional basketball player. He played college basketball for Louisiana State University (LSU) before being drafted fourth overall by the Portland Trail Blazers in the 2006 NBA draft. He was then traded to the Chicago Bulls where he went on to play three and a half seasons when in February 2010, he was traded to the Charlotte Bobcats.

High school career
As a 5'10" freshman, Thomas tried out for his varsity basketball team but was cut. He only played organized basketball in his last two years at McKinley High School in Baton Rouge, but never really built up enough recruiting hype to be considered a top 100 prospect. One later opened up when a JUCO recruit was kicked off LSU's team and saw his scholarship offer rescinded. As a senior, Tyrus averaged 16 points, 12 rebounds and six blocks per game, earning him all-second team honors in Louisiana.

College career
As a redshirted freshman at LSU in 2005–06, Thomas was the team's starting power forward, and because of his leaping ability, he developed a reputation as an outstanding shot blocker, rebounder and dunker. He was named the SEC Freshman of the Year after averaging 12.3 points, 9.2 rebounds and 3.1 blocks in 32 games (22 starts) while shooting over 60% from the field. Thomas was also recognized as the NCAA Atlanta Region MVP in the NCAA Tournament after combining for 30 points against the likes of Duke and Texas.

2006 NCAA Tournament
Thomas entered the 2006 NCAA Tournament still recovering from a sprained ankle suffered in the February 26 game against Kentucky that caused him to miss the last two regular season games and the SEC Tournament. However, the injury did not hamper him as he continued the pattern of the regular season, his performances in the 2006 NCAA Tournament improved with every passing game as #4 seed LSU advanced to their first Final Four since 1986. His minutes were somewhat limited by the injury in the first-round game against No. 13 seed Iona and the second-round game against No. 12 seed Texas A&M but he was back to form by LSU's Atlanta Regional semi-final (Sweet 16) matchup against perennial power and overall top seed Duke. In the Duke game, Thomas recorded 9 points, 13 rebounds and 5 blocks despite being limited to 25 minutes due to early foul trouble as LSU held Duke to a 27.7 percent field goal percentage and only 54 points, the school's lowest output since 1996. Thomas was even more dominant in the Regional Final (Elite Eight) win against No. 2 seed Texas, recording 21 points, 13 rebounds and 3 blocks. These performances earned Thomas the Atlanta Regional's Most Valuable Player award.

Professional career

Chicago Bulls (2006–2010) 
On April 17, 2006, Thomas announced his intention to enter the NBA draft, and signed with an agent, removing his college eligibility. On June 28, 2006, Thomas was drafted fourth overall in the 2006 NBA draft by the Portland Trail Blazers. He was later traded to the Chicago Bulls for the second overall pick, LaMarcus Aldridge on draft night.

Thomas appeared in 72 games his rookie year, with four starts, and averaged 5.2 points, 3.7 rebounds and 1.1 blocks in 13.4 minutes per game. He participated in the Sprite Rising Stars Slam Dunk Contest, becoming the first Chicago Bulls representative since Scottie Pippen entered the contest in 1990. He tied a season-high 11 rebounds, including the game-winning tip-in with 0.2 seconds to play against Denver Nuggets on March 22. He then posted a career-high 27 points and grabbed eight rebounds against Cleveland Cavaliers on March 31. He subsequently earned NBA All-Rookie second team honors.

Thomas appeared in 74 games his sophomore year, with 27 starts, and averaged 6.8 points, 4.6 rebounds, 1.2 assists and 1.0 blocks per game. He posted 21 points, 12 rebounds and 3 blocks in the second game of the season against the Philadelphia 76ers and went on to finish the season very strong in April with a 24-point performance against the Boston Celtics, a 20-point, 14-rebound performance against the Cleveland Cavaliers, and a 26-point performance in the season finale against the Toronto Raptors.

Thomas had a career-best season in 2008–09 as he averaged 10.8 points, 6.4 rebounds, 1.0 assists, 1.2 steals and 1.9 blocks in 79 games (61 starts).
After what was a career-best season for Thomas in 2008–09, he managed just four games for the Bulls in 2009–10 before fracturing his forearm during practice on November 6, putting him out for four to six weeks. He returned to action on December 26 and came off the bench behind rookie Taj Gibson.

Charlotte Bobcats (2010–2013) 
On February 18, 2010, Thomas was traded to the Charlotte Bobcats in exchange for Ronald Murray, Acie Law and a future first-round draft pick.

On July 12, 2010, Thomas re-signed with the Bobcats to a five-year, $40 million deal.

On January 25, 2012, in a loss to the Washington Wizards, Thomas recorded a career-high 9 blocked shots, one shy of the franchise record.

On July 10, 2013, Thomas was waived by the Bobcats via the amnesty clause.

Iowa Energy (2015)
On January 13, 2015, Thomas was acquired by the Iowa Energy of the NBA Development League.

Memphis Grizzlies (2015) 
On January 22, Thomas signed a 10-day contract with the Memphis Grizzlies.

Return to Iowa (2015) 
Following the expiration of his contract on February 1, Thomas was not offered a second 10-day contract by the Grizzlies and subsequently returned to Iowa two days later.

Eisbären Bremerhaven (2015–2016) 
On September 4, 2015, Thomas signed a one-year deal with Eisbären Bremerhaven of the Basketball Bundesliga. On February 26, 2016, he parted ways with Bremerhaven after averaging 3.6 points and 3.4 rebounds per game in Bundesliga.

NBA career statistics

Regular season

|-
| style="text-align:left;"|
| style="text-align:left;"|Chicago
| 72 || 4 || 13.4 || .475 || .000 || .606 || 3.7 || .6 || .6 || 1.1 || 5.2
|-
| style="text-align:left;"|
| style="text-align:left;"|Chicago
| 74 || 27 || 18.0 || .423 || .167 || .741 || 4.6 || 1.2 || .6 || 1.0 || 6.8
|-
| style="text-align:left;"|
| style="text-align:left;"|Chicago
| 79 || 61 || 27.5 || .451 || .333 || .783 || 6.5 || 1.0 || 1.2 || 1.9 || 10.8
|-
| style="text-align:left;"|
| style="text-align:left;"|Chicago
| 29 || 3 || 23.4 || .483 || .000 || .644 || 6.3 || 1.1 || 1.4 || 1.7 || 8.8
|-
| style="text-align:left;"|
| style="text-align:left;"|Charlotte
| 25 || 0 || 21.7 || .442 || .000 || .729 || 6.1 || .9 || .9 || 1.5 || 10.1
|-
| style="text-align:left;"|
| style="text-align:left;"|Charlotte
| 41 || 2 || 21.0 || .471 || .000 || .787 || 5.5 || .7 || .7 || 1.6 || 10.2
|-
| style="text-align:left;"|
| style="text-align:left;"| Charlotte
| 54 || 30 || 18.8 || .367 || .333 || .759 || 3.7 || .6 || .7 || 1.1 || 5.6
|-
| style="text-align:left;"|
| style="text-align:left;"|Charlotte
| 26 || 2 || 13.8 || .353 || .375 || .839 || 2.3 || .7 || .5 || .6 || 4.8
|-
| style="text-align:left;"|
| style="text-align:left;"|Memphis
| 2 || 0 || 3.5 || 1.000 ||  || 1.000 || .0 || .5 || .0 || .0 || 2.0
|- class="sortbottom"
| style="text-align:center;" colspan="2"|Career
| 402 || 129 || 19.7 || .438 || .235 || .732 || 4.8 || .9 || .8 || 1.3 || 7.7

Playoffs

|-
| style="text-align:left;"|2007
| style="text-align:left;"|Chicago
| 10 || 0 || 12.2 || .390 ||  || .633 || 3.4 || .6 || 1.0 || .5 || 5.1
|-
| style="text-align:left;"|2009
| style="text-align:left;"|Chicago
| 7 || 7 || 27.9 || .438 || .000 || .786 || 6.3 || .9 || 1.0 || 2.9 || 9.6
|-
| style="text-align:left;"|2010
| style="text-align:left;"|Charlotte
| 4 || 0 || 17.0 || .625 ||  || .833 || 5.5 || .5 || .5 || .5 || 8.8
|- class="sortbottom"
| style="text-align:center;" colspan="2"|Career
| 21 || 7 || 18.3 || .457 || .000 || .700 || 4.8 || .7 || .9 || 1.3 || 7.3

Personal life
Thomas is known for his extensive tattoo work. He was introduced to tattoos by his mother, who brought him to a tattoo artist when he was in tenth grade. Although he was a minor when he got his first tattoo and he is self-described as "very pro-tattoos", as an adult he has done a complete 180 and is now "anti-kids and tattoos".

References

External links

 LSU Tigers bio
 ESPN.com profile
 DraftExpress.com profile

1986 births
Living people
African-American basketball players
American expatriate basketball people in Germany
American men's basketball players
Basketball players from Baton Rouge, Louisiana
Charlotte Bobcats players
Chicago Bulls players
Eisbären Bremerhaven players
Iowa Energy players
LSU Tigers basketball players
McKinley Senior High School alumni
Memphis Grizzlies players
Portland Trail Blazers draft picks
Power forwards (basketball)
21st-century African-American sportspeople
20th-century African-American people